New Mills is a town in Derbyshire, England.

New Mills may also refer to:

In the Derbyshire town 
New Mills A.F.C.
New Mills Central railway station
New Mills Newtown railway station
New Mills School
New Mills Urban District, former local government district

Elsewhere 
New Mills, Cornwall, England
New Mills, New Brunswick, Canada, near Heron Island

See also
Newmills railway station, County Donegal, Ireland
Newmills, County Tyrone, Northern Ireland
New Mill (disambiguation)
Newmill, Moray, Scotland
Newmill-on-Teviot, Scottish Borders